Dick Mills (born 1936) is a British sound engineer, specialising in electronic sound effects which he produced at the BBC Radiophonic Workshop.

Mills was one of the original staff at the Radiophonic Workshop, joining in 1958 as a technical assistant. At first he was employed to handle the hardware of the Workshop but soon found himself recording effects. Some of his earliest, uncredited sound work was on the 1958 BBC science-fiction serial Quatermass and the Pit. Another of his prominent early recordings was the "Major Bloodnok's Stomach" sound effect, a significant part of the popular The Goon Show.

Although he recorded much in those early years, it is his later work on Doctor Who for which he is most remembered. In 1972, he took over from fellow BBC Radiophonic Workshop sound effects producer Brian Hodgson, whom he had sometimes previously assisted, and continued providing "special sound" for every episode of the programme, with the exception of two four-part stories, until it ended in 1989. He also provided special sound for the Doctor Who spin-off K-9 and Company. As such, he has the distinction of having more on-screen credits than anyone else in the history of the series. Owing to his technical know-how, he managed to bring to the position new methods of recording sound effects quicker than before. Besides his sound effects on Doctor Who, he also produced and compiled the first of the programme's music compilations, Doctor Who - The Music and Doctor Who - The Music II. Over the years, many of his own sound effects have also appeared on various compilations.

Other sound effects he provided included material for the cult series Moonbase 3, produced in 1973 by then-Doctor Who producer Barry Letts, and also occasionally sounds for The Two Ronnies.

Mills' work was acknowledged in a Doctor Who documentary broadcast on The Lively Arts in 1977. The same year, he appeared on the BBC's children's magazine programme Blue Peter to demonstrate how some of the Doctor Who effects were realised and how children could make their own sound effects at home. He also appeared in the 2004 BBC Radiophonic Workshop BBC Four documentary Alchemists of Sound.

He is also the author of many books on aquaria and tropical fish, as well as a former editor of The Aquarist and Pondkeeper magazine and a member of the Federation of British Aquatic Societies Council.

References

www.fbas.co.uk

External links

1936 births
BBC Radiophonic Workshop
English audio engineers
English male composers
Living people